The Saginaw Intermediate School District (SISD) is an intermediate school district in Michigan, headquartered in Saginaw.

Most of Saginaw County is served by the Saginaw Intermediate School District, which coordinates the efforts of local boards of education, but has no operating authority over schools. Local school boards in Michigan retain great autonomy over day-to-day operations.

Composition

The Saginaw Intermediate School District includes many public school districts, private schools, charter schools, colleges, and facilities.

Public school districts
As of November 2013, the communities of Saginaw County are served by the following members of the Saginaw ISD:

 Birch Run Area Schools: the village of Birch Run, Taymouth Township, and all but the northeastern sections of Birch Run Township
 Bridgeport-Spaulding Community School District: Bridgeport, Spaulding townships, and a small portion of Buena Vista Charter Township
 Carrollton Public Schools: Carrollton Township
 Chesaning Union Schools: the villages of Chesaning and Oakley, Albee and Brady townships, the southern parts of Brant and St. Charles townships, eastern Chapin Township, and small parts of Maple Grove Township
 Frankenmuth School District: the city of Frankenmuth, Frankenmuth township, northeastern Birch Run Township, southern Blumfield Township, and southeastern Buena Vista Charter Township
 Freeland Community School District: Tittabawassee Township, the northern portion of Thomas Township, and the westernmost sections of Kochville Township
 Hemlock Public School District: Richland Township, western Thomas Township and central Fremont Township
 Merrill Community Schools: the village of Merrill, Jonesfield and Lakefield townships, most of Marion Township
 Saginaw Public School District: the cities of Saginaw, Buena Vista, and Zilwaukee, the eastern part of Kochville Township, and western part of Buena Vista Charter Township
 Saginaw Township Community Schools: Saginaw Township
 St. Charles Community Schools: the village of St. Charles, the northern portions of Brant and St. Charles townships, and the southern portions of Fremont and Swan Creek townships
 Swan Valley School District: James Township, northeastern Swan Creek Township, eastern Thomas Township

Former school districts
 Buena Vista School District: Dissolved in 2013

Private schools
The Saginaw Intermediate School District includes several private schools, such as:.
 Bridgeport Baptist Academy
 Community Baptist Christian School
 Grace Christian School
 Michigan Lutheran Seminary
 Nouvel Catholic Central High School
 Valley Lutheran High School

Charter schools
The Saginaw Intermediate School District includes charter schools, such as the Saginaw Learn to Earn Academy.

Colleges
The Saginaw Intermediate School District includes these colleges:
 Davenport University (Saginaw campus)
 Delta College
 Saginaw Valley State University

Agencies and facilities
The Saginaw Intermediate School District includes these agencies and facilities, which are mostly run by the SISD:
 Hartley Outdoor Education Center
 Michael J McGivney School
 Saginaw County Juvenile Center
 Wolverine Secure Treatment Center / Wolverine Academy

See also
 List of schools in the Saginaw Intermediate School District
 List of intermediate school districts in Michigan

References

External links
 Saginaw Intermediate School District
 Saginaw Intermediate School District (Archive)